The Johnstown Tomahawks are a Tier II junior ice hockey team in the North American Hockey League's East Division. The team plays its home games at the 1st Summit Bank Arena at Cambria County War Memorial in Johnstown, Pennsylvania.  It is the oldest extant franchise in the NAHL.

History

The franchise was originally called the Dearborn Magic, Michigan Nationals, and the Dearborn Heights Nationals when the team played in Dearborn, Michigan. before moving and becoming St. Louis Sting in 1996. In 2001, the Sting moved to Springfield, Missouri, as the Springfield Spirit. In 2005, they moved to Wasilla, Alaska, as the Wasilla Spirit, only to re-brand themselves as the Alaska Avalanche the next season. The Avalanche played out of the Curtis D. Menard Memorial Sports Center in Wasilla until the end of the 2009–10 season. The Avalanche moved to Palmer, Alaska, beginning in the 2010–11 season and played at the Palmer Ice Arena.

The team relocated to Johnstown, Pennsylvania, in 2012, taking the place of the ECHL's Johnstown Chiefs, who moved to Greenville, South Carolina, in 2011. They became known as the Johnstown Tomahawks 

The Tomahawks played their first game on September 8, 2012, against the Port Huron Fighting Falcons and lost 4–3 in overtime. They won their first game in a 6–5 shootout on September 13, 2012, over the Kenai River Brown Bears. Their first home game at the Cambria County War Memorial Arena was played on September 29, 2012, losing 3–2 in a shootout to the Michigan Warriors.

Season-by-season records
Note: as of conclusion of 2020–21 season

References

External links 
Official site
Cambria County War Memorial Arena
Johnstown Tomahawks Team Information

North American Hockey League teams
North American Hockey League
Johnstown, Pennsylvania
Ice hockey teams in Pennsylvania
2012 establishments in Pennsylvania
Ice hockey clubs established in 2012